Brewton may refer to:

People
Maia Brewton (born 1977), actress
Pete Brewton, American journalist and academic

Places
In the United States
Brewton, Alabama, a city 
Brewton, Georgia, an unincorporated community
Brewton, Mississippi, a ghost town

Other
Brewton Municipal Airport serving Brewton, Alabama
USS Brewton (FF-1086), a US Navy frigate

See also
Bruton (disambiguation)